Anthony Ian "Beau" Cottrell  (10 February 1907 – 10 December 1988) was a New Zealand rugby union player. A hooker and prop, Cottrell represented Canterbury at a provincial level and was a member of the New Zealand national side, the All Blacks, from 1929 to 1932. He played 22 matches for the All Blacks including 11 internationals. He went on to serve as a member of the management committee of the Canterbury Rugby Union.

During World War II, Cottrell served as an officer with the New Zealand 20th Battalion. He was taken prisoner-of-war during the First Battle of El Alamein in July 1942, when he was wounded going to the assistance of a wounded man in his platoon.

Cottrell was later an active Rotarian and served as a district governor. In the 1968 New Year Honours, he was appointed a Commander of the Order of the British Empire, for services to the community. In 1977, Cottrell was awarded the Queen Elizabeth II Silver Jubilee Medal.

References

1907 births
1988 deaths
Canterbury rugby union players
New Zealand Commanders of the Order of the British Empire
New Zealand international rugby union players
New Zealand military personnel of World War II
New Zealand prisoners of war in World War II
New Zealand referees and umpires
New Zealand rugby union players
People educated at Christ's College, Christchurch
Rugby union hookers
Rugby union players from Westport, New Zealand
Rugby union props
Weston family (New Zealand)